Christian Puibaraud (born 21 February 1938) is a French rower. He competed at the 1960 Summer Olympics in Rome with the men's eight where they came fourth.

References

1938 births
Living people
French male rowers
Olympic rowers of France
Rowers at the 1960 Summer Olympics
People from Courbevoie
World Rowing Championships medalists for France
Sportspeople from Hauts-de-Seine
European Rowing Championships medalists